Kurien Thomas (1922–2000) or Kurian Thomas was pioneer pentecostal missionary  to Central India.

Pioneering works
He hailed from Kerala. In the beginning he was a missionary from the India Pentecostal Church of God  but later formed a new organization called the Fellowship of the Pentecostal Churches in India  along with other Christian leaders. He authored several books originally in Hindi, English, and Malayalam. He was the pastor of the Pentecostal Church at Itarsi, Founder/Chairman and later Patron of the Fellowship of the Pentecostal Churches in India, and Principal of the Central India Bible College, estd. in 1962 (now Central India Theological Seminary)  for several years. He was recipient of several awards for his outstanding contributions in the field of Christian literature, education, and ministry. His book God's Trailblazer In and Around the World was his autobiography.

Kurien Thomas also began a Hindi Christian magazine called Satyadoot that is one of the prominent Christian magazine in the Hindi language.

The Fellowship of the Pentecostal Churches in India has now over 1100 pastors working in close network with headquarters at the mother Church at Itarsi. Pastor Kurien pastored the Church from 1945 till his death in 2000. He is now succeeded by his son Dr. Matthew K. Thomas who is also the Chairman of the Fellowship (FPCGI), Editor-in-Chief of "Basileia", Secretary of Pentecostal World Fellowship, and President/Principal of Central India Theological Seminary.

Selected bibliography
All writings were published by Central India Bible College, Itarsi.
अतीत की पगडंडिया Autobiography
परिणयगाथा A Commentary on the Songs of Solomon
प्रकाशितवाक्‍य A Commentary on Revelation
मिलापवाला तंबु The Tabernacle
पवित्र आत्‍मा Holy Spirit
धर्मविज्ञान प्रणाली Systematic Theology
Ruth: Malayalam

References

External links
Allan Anderson, Asian and Pentecostal 
Kerala Pentecostalism 
Indian Christianity 
The Trumpet

Christian clergy from Kerala
1922 births
2000 deaths
Indian Pentecostals
Pentecostal missionaries